The Alamo Area Library System (AALS) is one of ten public library systems in the U.S. state of Texas.  It consists of 46 member libraries located in 21 counties that surround the city of San Antonio and Bexar County. The San Antonio Public Library acts as the personnel and fiscal agent for AALS and houses the system office. AALS provides consulting and continuing education service to public and school librarians that reside in the San Antonio metropolitan area.

Consulting services 
AALS staff consult in many areas of library services such as:

Collection development 
Materials selection;
bilingual materials;
weeding; and
vendors.

Library administration 
Policies;
management;
planning;
facilities; and
annual reports.

Grants 
Grant reviews and resources.

Publicity/programming 
Marketing plans;
summer reading programs; and 
children's services.

Technology 
Integrated library systems;
technical specifications;
networks; and
hardware/software.

Continuing education 
AALS offers many continuing education opportunities to library staff members throughout the year.  Topics change each year, but are generally offered in the following broad categories:

Collection Development
Children's Services
Technology
Administration and Finance
Marketing
Friends, Boards and Trustees
Technical Services
Reference
Readers' Advisory
Buildings and Facilities

Member libraries 
Kronkosky Library of Bandera County
Boerne Public Library
Kinney County Public Library
Bulverde/Spring Branch Library
Camp Wood Public Library
Tye Preston Memorial Library
Dimmit County Public Library
Castroville Public Library
Charlotte Public Library
Comfort Public Library
Converse Public Library
Alexander Memorial Library
Crystal City Memorial Library
Val Verde County Library
Driscoll Public Library
Dilley Public Library
Eagle Pass Public Library
Falls City Public Library
Sam Fore, Jr. Wilson County Public Library
Pioneer Memorial Library
Hondo Public Library
Jourdanton Public Library
Karnes City Public Library
Kendalia Public Library
Kenedy Public Library
Butt-Holdsworth Memorial Library
Lakehills Area Library
Real County Public Library
Leon Valley Public Library
Lytle Public Library
Marion ISD Community Library
Medina Community Library
New Braunfels Public Library
Pearsall Public Library
Pleasanton Public Library
Poteet Public Library
Quemado Public Library
Gilmer Memorial Library
Runge Public Library
Sabinal Public Library
San Antonio Public Library
Schertz Public Library
Seguin-Guadalupe County Public Library
Universal City Public Library
Utopia Memorial Library
El Progeso Memorial Library

External links 
AALS
San Antonio Public Library 
Texas State Library and Archives Commission
Institute of Museum and Library Services

County library systems in Texas
Libraries in Bexar County, Texas
Education in Comal County, Texas
Libraries in San Antonio